Hexafluoroisobutylene is an organofluorine compound with the formula (CF3)2C=CH2. This colorless gas is structurally similar to isobutylene.  It is used as a comonomer in the production of modified polyvinylidene fluoride.  It is produced in a multistep process starting with the reaction of acetic anhydride with hexafluoroacetone.  It is oxidized by sodium hypochlorite to hexafluoroisobutylene oxide.  As expected, it is a potent dienophile.

See also
Perfluoroisobutene

References

Trifluoromethyl compounds
Haloalkenes
Gases